Too Far To Whisper is the fifth studio album by new-age group Shadowfax, the fourth and final for Windham Hill Records.

Track listing
 "Too Far To Whisper" (G. E. Stinson) – 4:36
 "What Goes Around" (Stinson) – 4:29
 "China Blue" (Phil Maggini) – 4:11
 "The Orangutan Gang (Strikes Back)" (David C. Lewis) – 3:53
 "Road To Hanna" (Charlie Bisharat) – 4:08
 "Streetnoise" (Greenberg) – 4:17
 "Slim Limbs Akimbo" (Stuart Nevitt) – 4:03
 "Tsunami" (Lewis) – 4:40
 "Maceo" (Maggini) – 4:01
 "Ritual" (Greenberg, Maggini, Stinson) – 4:00

Personnel
Chuck Greenberg – ocarina, soprano saxophone, tenor saxophone, wood flute, Lyricon
 Charlie Bisharat: violin, electric violin
 Phil Maggini: Electric bass, vocals
 Stuart Nevitt: percussion, drums, gong, marimbas, timbales, xylophone, balafon, vibes, octoban
 G. E. Stinson: guitar, vocals, tamboura, mbira
 David C. Lewis: synthesizer, piano, keyboards, Moog synthesizer

Additional personnel
 Adam Rudolph: percussion, conga, drums, tabla, batá, talking drum, bird calls, gudu gudu
 Morris Dollison: guitar, vocals
 Emil Richards: synthesizer, percussion, drums, gong, marimbas, steel drums, angklung, synthesized percussion, log drums, cabasa
 Hara Lambi A.: vocals, background vocals

Charts

References 

Shadowfax (band) albums
1986 albums
Windham Hill Records albums